Chapter Dos is the third album from Bachata group, Xtreme. It was released November 24, 2008. The single, "Through That Window (Enamorado Estoy)" peaked 27 on Billboard's Hot Latin Songs chart.

Track listing

On The Verge

On November 17, 2009, Chapter Dos: On the Verge was released. This was either their fourth studio album, their first compilation album, or a re-edition of Chapter Dos based on the name. The words "On The Verge" are from their 2009 reality show from Mun2.

Charts

Weekly charts

Year-end charts

See also
List of number-one Billboard Tropical Albums from the 2000s

References

2008 albums
Xtreme (group) albums
Machete Music albums